Louis Jacobus Burger (born 12 March 1978) is a Namibian cricketer. He is a right-handed batsman and a right-arm medium-pace bowler.

He participated in List A cricket between 2001 and 2005 and made six One Day International appearances in the World Cup in 2003. His brother Sarel Burger played for Namibia in the World Cup, while Bernie Burger has played in the ICC Trophy.

In the latter part of 2006, Louis Burger hit two centuries, the first of his career in October against Limpopo, and the second, a career-topping high of 120 against the United Arab Emirates in December.

References

External links

1978 births
Living people
Namibian cricketers
Namibia One Day International cricketers
Cricketers from Windhoek
Namibian cricket captains